Olivella mica is a species of small sea snail, marine gastropod mollusk in the subfamily Olivellinae, in the family Olividae, the olives.  Species in the genus Olivella are commonly called dwarf olives.

Description

Distribution
This species occurs in the Caribbean Sea off Jamaica and Martinique.

References

 Vervaet F.L.J. (2018). The living Olividae species as described by Pierre-Louis Duclos. Vita Malacologica. 17: 1-111

External links
 Duclos, P. L. (1835-1840). Histoire naturelle générale et particulière de tous les genres de coquilles univalves marines a l'état vivant et fossile publiée par monographie. Genre Olive. Paris: Institut de France. 33 plates: pls 1-12
 Reeve, L. A. (1850). Monograph of the genus Oliva. In: Conchologia Iconica, or, illustrations of the shells of molluscous animals, vol. 6, pl. 1-30 and unpaginated text. L. Reeve & Co., London.
 MNHN, Paris: syntype

mica
Gastropods described in 1835